Stefan Wolski (born October 24, 1914, in Uman in the Kiev Governorate; died March 23, 1992, in Lublin, Poland) was a prose writer and poet, lawyer, and participant in Lublin's literary life.

Life 
He was born to a Polish intellectual family of noble origin as the son of Walery Ludwik Wolski and Benigna Katarzyna Sobańska. During the October Revolution, after the disappearance of her father, the mother repatriated him and her older son Antoni to Poland; finally, in 1922, he settled in Lublin.

In 1928, he enrolled in the Stanisław Staszic State Gymnasium in Lublin He passed his high school diploma in 1935, after which he completed his military service, completing the reserve cadet course in Lutsk. In the 1936/1937 academic year, he began studies at the Faculty of Law and Social and Economic Sciences of the Catholic University of Lublin, working at the same time in the City Board (he was, among others, secretary of the city president). In 1939, he married Regina Kocyk.

He passed the World War II and the Nazi occupation in the ranks of the Home Army as a second lieutenant, then a lieutenant. He operated under the pseudonym "Tomasz". He was the head of distribution in the District BIP cell.

After the war, he continued his law studies at the Catholic University of Lublin, on August 30, 1946, he obtained a master's degree in law, after completing his court training, he was entered on the list of attorneys. As a lawyer, he defended people tried during the Stalinist era for activities against the system. He was considered to be a specialist in this type of defense.

Stefan Wolski was a founding member of the Lublin Branch of the Polish Writers' Union, in whose structures he acted as min. functions of a secretary, treasurer, vice-president. Since then, he has continuously participated in the organized forms of literary and artistic life in Lublin. He organized for the society of Lublin and the Lublin region the so-called "Literary action",  meetings with authors with the participation of members of the branch and colleagues from other departments of the Union. Personally, he often and willingly met the society in Lublin and the field, also with school youth, trying to enrich their knowledge about Polish and foreign literature and culture as much as possible. He organized "Kamena Nights" in Lublin in the 1950s and 1960s. He collaborated with the editorial offices of: "Czas", "Świt" before the war, "Stolica", "Nowiny literackie" and "Kamena" after the war, also as a member of the editorial office.

He was buried at the Catholic cemetery at Lipowa Street in Lublin, Poland.

Writings

Prose 

 Zew serc (1930) -  
 Zdarzyło się w FSC (1966) -  
 Ballada chłopska (1968) – biographical story about Fr. Piotr Ściegienny, leader of peasants in the Kingdom of Poland, organizer of the uprising of 1844 in Lublin and Kielce, 
 Przygody w dolinie zbójów (1971)- something more than a fairy tale with a moral, 
 Ballada rycerska (1977) – a historical novel about the Krakow Uprising in 1846 and Edward Dembowski, 
 Światła Erebu(1980) -  
 Skrzyżowania (1988) -

Poetry 

 Droga do Odry (1949)
 Sztafeta (1950)
 Fantazje olimpijskie (1952)
 Wiersze z Lublina (1953)
 Kronika Lublina (1954)
 Lublin inkaustem złoty (1954)
 Pióro czasu (1958)
 Szedłem tędy (1959)
 Ona (1963)
 Kształty i inwokacje (1965)
 Miłosne rejsy (1973)
 Historia czarnego goździka (1977)
 Wymiary błękitu (1977)
 Pamięć zwierciadeł (1979)
 Poezje -

Stories 

 Ostrokół (1960) - Nowy, Broszka, Kosma, Groch, Barbara i Ewa, Ostrokół, U dozorcy, Na ławce, 
 Opowiadania - Adwokat, Chodźmy już stryjku Jakubie, Noc Augusta Wiewióry, Skarb Eligiusza Kiszki, Wierna, Piotr i Dominik, Suma niezwykła, W niedzielę, Szachownica, Ściegieńczycy, Towarzysze, Spotkanie, Nelly and Johnny, 
 Ze wspomnień - Preparat, Inteligent, Odwiedziny, Niespodzianka, Człowiek, Ze wspomnień, Daleka droga, Księżycowy kapral,

Dramas 

 Choćby za sto lat (1954) - art against the background of the rebellion of the Peasants' Union, Fr. Piotr Ściegienny
 Upadek Złotego (1955)- a comedy from the early period of the Workers' Holiday Fund
 Niedobra droga (1956)- art from the period of emergence after World War II
 Złoty pierścionek (1961) - art against the backdrop of the Warsaw Uprising
 Dramaty -

Play 

 Fredro w Lublinie - broadcast around 1950 by the broadcasting station of Polish Radio in Lublin.

Others 

 W antologii poezji morskiej (1949)
 W antologii „Mickiewicz w poezji polskiej i obcej” - Ossolineum (1961)
 W opowiadaniach turystycznych - Lawiny schodzą w południe; Odwiedziny (1972)
 Rok 1948 w wydawnictwie jubileuszowym - opowiadanie Adwokat
 Poeci Świata Wietnamowi antologia (1968)
 Wskrzeszanie pamięci Antologia poetów lubelskich (1998) - wiersze: Wspomnienie z Kazimierza i Sen

Honors

Polish 

 Krzyż Kawalerski Orderu Odrodzenia Polski (1984)
 Srebrny Krzyż Zasługi (1974)
 Medal „Za zasługi dla obronności kraju” (1976)
 Srebrna odznaka „Zasłużonemu dla Lublina” (1978)
 Złota odznaka „Zasłużonemu dla Lublina” (1987)
 Odznaka „Zasłużony Działacz Kultury” (1971)
 Odznaka „Za zasługi dla Lubelszczyzny” (1984)

Foreign 

 Croix du Merite
 Sphinx Cross
 La Croix de Partisan
 La Croix de Passeur 
 Medaille de Reconnaissance 
 Medaille d'Europe 
 The Commemorative War Medal of General Eisenhower
 The Interallied Distinguished Service Cross

He received an award for lifetime literary activity of WRN in Lublin in 1969, an award at the "Tourist" literary competition in 1957 for the short story "Daleka Droga", and the WRZZ award at a literary competition for the short story "Wyznania mojego bohatera" in 1977.

Gallery

References 

 Ireneusz Caban, "Ludzie lubelskiego okręgu Armii Krajowej", publisher: "Czas", Lublin 1995; pages 213,231,236   
 Longin Jan Okoń, "Wskrzeszanie pamięci antologia poetów lubelskich",  publisher: Związek Literatów Polskich - Oddział w Lublinie, Lublin 1998; page 211  
 "Współcześni polscy pisarze i badacze literatury"; Słownik Biobibliograficzny Tom IX; Instytut Badań Literackich PAN & WSiP, Warszawa 2004; page 257  

John Paul II Catholic University of Lublin alumni
Polish writers
Polish poets
20th-century Polish lawyers
Home Army members
Recipients of the Medal of Merit for National Defence
1914 births
1992 deaths
Recipient of the Meritorious Activist of Culture badge